Wilfred Thomas Kirkham (26 November 1901 – 20 October 1974) was an English footballer who holds four goalscoring records at Port Vale. His 153 league goals and 164 goals in all competitions are both records, as his tally of 38 goals in the 1926–27 season and his total tally of 13 competitive hat-tricks. A cousin of Tom Holford, he was noted for his "Kirkham Special" hook shots, intelligent football and prolific scoring record.

After spending time with Cobridge Church and Congleton Town, he graduated as a teacher. Splitting his time between teaching and playing football, he turned professional with Port Vale in 1923. After six prolific seasons with the "Valiants", he was sold on to rivals Stoke City for a £2,800 fee after the Vale suffered relegation out of the Second Division. He scored 30 goals in 51 games for the "Potters", before returning to Port Vale in January 1932, who had now regained their Second Division status. He added 19 goals in 51 appearances, before announcing his retirement in summer 1933. His combined tally in his ten years at both Stoke-on-Trent clubs is 194 goals in 327 games. He later advanced his teaching career when he became a headmaster.

Playing career
Kirkham was born in Cobridge, Stoke-on-Trent, and progressed from a promising schoolboy footballer through Cobridge Church and Congleton Town, before heading to Sheffield to go through teacher training. Upon his return numerous clubs approached him, but Kirkham joined local side Port Vale after a successful trial in April 1920.

He turned professional in August 1923, making his debut on 27 October at Elland Road in 3–0 defeat by Leeds United. He scored his first senior goal on 19 January 1924, in a 3–1 win over Coventry City at Highfield Road. On 8 March, he scored twice in a 3–1 win over Fulham at The Old Recreation Ground. He went on to finish the 1923–24 season with seven goals in 21 Second Division games.

He quickly became virtually the Vale's only source of goals, and hit 33 goals in 44 games in 1924–25 – more than the rest of the squad combined. He scored his first hat-trick in the FA Cup, in an 8–2 demolition of non-league Alfreton on 13 December. He also hit hat-tricks in the league against tougher opposition, bagging three against both Clapton Orient and Stockport County. As well as this he hit the net twice in a 7–2 defeat to First Division club Aston Villa at Villa Park, in the First Round Proper of the FA Cup.

On 7 September 1925, Kirkham scored a hat-trick in a 3–0 victory over rivals Stoke City at the Victoria Ground. This completed the double over Stoke, as he scored twice in a 3–0 home victory eight days previously. On 19 September, he hit the net four times in a 6–1 thrashing of Darlington. He also scored hat-tricks against Middlesbrough and Preston North End, and finished the 1925–26 campaign with 35 goals in 41 appearances.

In the 1926–27 season, Kirkham scored a club record 38 league goals, in a total of 41 goals in 46 league and cup games. He hit hat-tricks against Grimsby Town, South Shields, Notts County, and Middlesbrough, and also hit four in a 7–1 win over Fulham. In the FA Cup, he earned the Vale a replay against Arsenal with the equaliser in a 2–2 draw, before the tie was lost at Highbury.

He never rediscovered his record-setting form, though still managed to hit 14 goals in 40 games in 1927–28. He also found himself briefly rested, as Stewart Littlewood found a short period of good form. Though he scored 15 goals in 32 appearances in 1928–29, hitting a hat-trick against Reading, the club suffered relegation into the Third Division North. Kirkham remained in the Second Division, after he transferred to Stoke City for a £2,800 fee; this was a club record for Stoke.

Kirkham continued his impressive scoring record with the "Potters", and hit a hat-trick past Nottingham Forest as he posted 15 goals in 27 games in 1929–30. He then a hit-trick past Oldham Athletic, and went on to score 14 goals in 23 appearances in 1930–31. However he broke his leg on the opening day of the 1931–32 season, in a 2–1 home win over Chesterfield. He never played again for Stoke, and instead made a surprise return to Port Vale in January 1932.

After impressing in the reserve side Kirkham was back in the "Valiants" first team. His first match back was another 3–0 victory over Stoke City – his return and the derby win proved a large moral boost for fans. He bagged four goals in 17 games in 1931–32. For the 1932–33 season, Kirkham was once more Vale's top scorer with 15 goals in 34 games. At the end of the campaign he announced his retirement from professional football, at the age of 32, to concentrate on his career as an educator. For both Potteries clubs he scored a total of 194 goals in 327 competitive games, an average of a goal every 1.7 games.

Teaching career
Upon his retirement from the game, Kirkham became head teacher of Cobridge C.E. School. He remained active in sports, winning numerous tennis and golf trophies. He went on to become Headmaster at Mill Hill School.

Career statistics
Source:

References

1901 births
1974 deaths
People from Cobridge
Footballers from Stoke-on-Trent
English Anglicans
English footballers
Association football forwards
Congleton Town F.C. players
Port Vale F.C. players
Stoke City F.C. players
English Football League players
English Football League representative players
Schoolteachers from Staffordshire